2017–18 Liga Națională may refer to the following competitions in Romania:
2017–18 Liga Națională (men's basketball)
2017–18 Liga Națională (women's basketball)
2017–18 Liga Națională (men's handball)
2017–18 Liga Națională (women's handball)